Sascha Weber (born 23 February 1988) is a German road and cyclo-cross cyclist. He represented his nation in the men's elite event at the 2016 UCI Cyclo-cross World Championships in Heusden-Zolder.

Major results

Cyclo-cross

2008–2009
 1st  National Under-23 Championships
2009–2010
 1st  National Under-23 Championships
2013–2014
 1st Cyclo-cross Kayl
 1st New Year's Grand Prix
 3rd National Championships
2014–2015
 1st Cyclocross Eschenbach, EKZ CrossTour
 1st Lorsch, GGEW City Cross Cup
2015–2016
 1st GP-5-Sterne-Region
 1st Flückiger Cross Madiswil
2016–2017
 1st Flückiger Cross Madiswil
 2nd National Championships
 10th World Championships
2017–2018
 2nd National Championships
2018–2019
 1st Internationales Radquer Steinmaur
 1st Grand Prix Möbel Alvisse
 1st Flückiger Cross Madiswil
 3rd National Championships
2019–2020
 1st Gran Premio Guerciotti

Road

2010
 6th Rund um den Finanzplatz Eschborn-Frankfurt U23
2011
 3rd Overall Sibiu Cycling Tour
 9th Omloop van het Houtland
 9th Antwerpse Havenpijl
2013
 6th Grand Prix Criquielion
2015
 4th Overall Flèche du Sud

Mountain

2015
 3rd  Marathon, European Championships
2016
 2nd Marathon, National Championships
2019
 1st  Marathon, National Championships

References

External links

1988 births
Living people
Cyclo-cross cyclists
German male cyclists
Sportspeople from Saarbrücken
German mountain bikers
Cyclists from Saarland